Leonard Bull (25 January 1935 – 23 November 2013) was a Kenyan sports shooter. He competed at the 1964, 1968 and 1972 Summer Olympics.

References

External links
 

1935 births
2013 deaths
Kenyan male sport shooters
Olympic shooters of Kenya
Shooters at the 1964 Summer Olympics
Shooters at the 1968 Summer Olympics
Shooters at the 1972 Summer Olympics
Commonwealth Games competitors for Kenya
Shooters at the 1966 British Empire and Commonwealth Games
Sportspeople from London
English emigrants to Kenya
20th-century Kenyan people